The Central Post Office in Nottingham was based on Queen Street from 1898 to 2019.

Early post offices
In 1799 Joseph Raynor was appointed the first postmaster in Nottingham and he had his post office on High Street. The post office didn't provide enough business as a full-time occupation so Raynor also ran a seedsman's business in his spare time.

In Spring 1831 the old post office building was pulled down  and the post office moved to a new building in Armitage Place on the other side of High Street. Trade had increased and the office employed four people.

In 1834 the Post Office moved again, this time to Bridlesmith Gate.

St Peter’s Churchside

On 14 October 1847 the foundation stone for a new post office was laid on the same site by the Mayor of Nottingham, William Cripps Esq.  Construction took longer than expected. In May 1848 it was reported that a hundredweight of lead was stolen from the construction site.  The new building was designed by the architect and surveyor to the Corporation of Nottingham, Henry Moses Wood

Postal business was transacted here until December 1868.

Victoria Street

In 1868 the Central Post Office moved into a new building at the top of Victoria Street. The building had been designed by James Williams of the Board of Works. It was designed as a Post Office, Telegraphic Office and Inland Revenue office.

The building was raised in 1883 by the architect Edward G. Rivers with the addition of a further floor.

On 2 August 1884 three packages of explosives was discovered at the post office. This was confirmed by Colonel Vivian Dering Majendie, the Chief Inspector of Explosives, and the packages were removed and destroyed without any damage to the building.

Queen Street
In June 1894 construction started on a new post office in Queen Street.  It was built in Ashlar in the Renaissance Revival Style. The contractors were T. Fish and Sons of Hermitage Mills, Hermit Street, Sneinton and the architect Henry Tanner of the Office of Works.  Without any formal ceremony it opened for business on 1 August 1898.

In 1970 it was decided to move into a much smaller building which was to occupy a quarter of the existing post office site, and part of the existing building was demolished for its construction.

The rest of the building continued as the central post office until 1972. It then lay empty for 11 years until a £750,000 grant. was made available in 1983 for restoration of the building.

Queen Street replacement building

On 4 April 1972 the Post Office moved into the new building just to the north of the existing office which had been constructed at a cost of £300,000.

Post Office business was transacted at the new Queen Street office until 2019 when it moved into W.H. Smith in the Victoria Centre.

Postmasters
In 1845 the Postmaster was responsible for the delivery of 1,238,692 mail items. By 1847 this had grown to 1,589,212. In 1873 the Postmaster oversaw the work of 30 letter carriers, 30 clerks and seven town receiving offices processing 6,760,000 mail items per year. By 1885 the number of people employed at the Central Post Office was 246 which included a postmaster, chief clerk, telegraphists, post-office clerks (70), stampers, sorters, letter carriers (110) and messengers, processing 14,040,000 mail items per year. The number of receiving offices was now 27.

List of Postmasters of Nottingham

Joseph Raynor from 1799
Mrs. Raynor until 1831
G.K. White until 1837
John Crosby 1837 - 1846
Octavius Thomas Oldknow 1846 - 1854
Thomas Robinson 1854 - 1873
William Edward Pratt 1873 - 1891
Bernard Nathaniel Thoms 1891 - 1904
William Vincent Harnett 1904 - 1912
H.R. Telford 1912 - 1922
Arthur Sirrett 1922 - 1926
George Pierrepont Cooper 1926 - 1928
Thomas John Hubbard 1928 - 1931
Major Vincent Raymond Kenny M.B.E. 1931 - 1933
Albert Edward Squirrell 1933 - 1938
H.E. Cotton 1938 - 1945
William Backhurst 1945 - 1948
Leonard Bishop 1948 - 1950
Victor George Alfred Nash 1950 - 1956
William Reginald Trigger 1956 - 1961
Maurice William Andrews 1961 - 1969
Roy William Jewell 1969 - 1982
David Wilkins from 1982

References

Grade II listed buildings in Nottinghamshire
Buildings and structures in Nottingham
Buildings and structures completed in 1898
Post office buildings in the United Kingdom